

Events

January
January 10: Superman & Batman vs. Aliens & Predator released.
 January 16: Dutch cartoonist Willem wins the Inktspotprijs for Best Political Cartoon. 
January 24: The Boys is canceled with issue #6.

February
February 2: Newsarama reports that The Boys has been picked up by Dynamite Entertainment.
 February 5: Gerben Valkema's comic strip Elsje (Lizzy in English) makes its debut.
February 28: Release of 2000 AD prog #1526. This is the 30th anniversary issue and will see the start of three new storylines: Flesh (by Pat Mills and Ramon Sola), Nikolai Dante (by Robbie Morrison & Simon Fraser) and Savage (by Pat Mills and Charlie Adlard)
 The final issue of Cracked is published.

March
 March 6: Albert Uderzo is honoured as Knight in the Order of the Netherlands Lion.
 March 7: Marvel Comics "kills" Captain America (US)
 March 14: The British children's TV show Blue Peter, who organized a competition to let young viewers choose which new character they would like to become a recurring cast member in the comic strip The Bash Street Kids declare the character Wayne the winner. 
 March 21: Andy Diggle starts his run on Hellblazer with issue #230
 With issue #215, Batman: Legends of theDark Knight is cancelled by DC.
 Webcomic Crying Macho Man is collected in a print edition

May
May 2: Weekly series 52 concludes.
 May 12: Bristol Comic Expo, start of two-day event
 May 23: British comic heroine Tank Girl returns after a twelve-year sojourn, with original writer Alan Martin on scripts and Australian penciler Ashley Wood on art. The four-part mini-series is called The Gifting and will be collected in time for Christmas.

July
 July 10–11: Doug Marlette, creator of Kudzu is killed in a car accident, which means the end of his series.
 July 25: The United States Postal Service released Marvel Superhero Stamps featuring Spider-Man, Wolverine, and other Marvel superheroes.

August
 August 11: Caption, start of two-day event
 August 14: Tokyopop begins publishing Undertown.
 August 26: The final episode of Kudzu is published. Half a month earlier the creator, Doug Marlette, died in a car accident.
 August 26: The final episode of Triple Take by Scott Nickel and Todd Clark is published.

September
 September 8: London Film & Comic Con, start of two-day event.
 September 9: The final episode of Farley is published. Creator Phil Frank passes away on 12 September from a brain tumor.
 September 15: Suske en Wiske receive a bust in Kalmthout, Belgium.
 September 29: During the Stripdagen in Houten, the Netherlands, Aloys Oosterwijk receives the Stripschapprijs. Ronald Grossey wins the P. Hans Frankfurtherprijs for his book about Studio Vandersteen. Henk Groeneveld wins the Bulletje en Boonestaakschaal.

October
October 10: The Best American series releases the second The Best American Comics publication. The collection is edited by Chris Ware and Anne Elizabeth Moore.
 October 20: The final episode of Posy Simmonds's Tamara Drewe is published.
October 30: Zuda Comics, a webcomics imprint of DC Comics, launches.

November
November 2: In Strasbourg the Tomi Ungerer Museum opens.
November 9: The Folger Shakespeare Library hosts Lynda Barry, Alison Bechdel, and Chris Ware in a discussion on graphic novels as a part of the PEN/Faulkner Reading Series.
November 21: The first episode of Signe Wilkinson's Family Tree is published. It will run until 2011.
November 28: The graphic novel Cherubs! by Bryan Talbot is published by Desperado Publishing.

December
December 11: Mike Le begins publishing the "Don't Forget To Validate Your Parking" webcomic.
 The final episode of Tumbleweeds is published.

Deaths

January 
 January 1: Tiberio Colantuoni, Italian comics artist (Bongo, worked for Rolf Kauka, Disney comics), dies at age 71.
 January 3: Sam Burlockoff, American comics artist and inker, passes away at age 82.
 January 8: Drew Posada, American comic colorist and pin-up artist, passes away at age 37 from pancreatitis.

February 
 February 8: Joe Edwards, American comics artist (Li'l Jinx), passes away at age 85.
 February 14: Willy Moese, German comics artist and animator (Bogomil, Klaus und Choko), dies at age 79.
 February 18: 
 Alfio Consoli, Italian comics artist (Demoniak), dies at age 61. 
 Bob Oksner, American comics artist (Miss Cario Jones, made various TV-based comics, continued Dondi), dies at age 90.

March
 March 3: Osvaldo Cavandoli, Italian animator and comics artist (La Linea), dies at age 87.
 March 5: Yvan Delporte, Belgian journalist (chief editor of Spirou 1955-1968) and comics writer, dies at age 78.
 March 6: Lina Buffolente, Italian comics artist and illustrator (Piccolo Ranger, Gun Gallon Homicron, Nick Reporter, Reno Kid, Comandante Mark), dies at age 82.
 March 9: Hugo Leyers, aka Haschèl or Hug, Belgian comics artist (De Geschiedenis van Vlaanderen, De Geschiedenis van Nederland, Met De Neus & Co Op Stap), passes away at age 77.
 March 12: Arnold Drake, American comics writer (It Rhymes with Lust, co-creator of the Doom Patrol and Deadman), dies at age 83.
 March 21: Drew Hayes, American comics artist and writer (Poison Elves), dies from a heart attack at age 37. 
 March 24: Marshall Rogers, American comics artist (continued Batman, Silver Surfer, Wolverine and Doctor Strange), dies from a heart attack at age 57.
 March 27: Boris Dimovski, Bulgarian comics artist (Once Upon A Time), passes away at age 81.
 March 29: Leslie Waller, American comics artist (It Rhymes with Lust), dies at age 82. 
 March 31: Massimo Belardinelli, Italian comics artist (Ace Trucking Co.), dies at age 68.

April
 April 7: Johnny Hart, American comics artist (B.C., The Wizard of Id), dies at age 76.
 April 15: Brant Parker, American comics artist (The Wizard of Id, Crock), dies at age 86 from a stroke.
 April 21: Art Saaf, American comics artist (worked for Highlights for Children magazine and made various comics for DC Comics, Fiction House, Harvey Comics, Quality Comics and Standard Comics), dies at age 85.
 April 29: José De Huescar, aka Garvi, Spanish comics artist (Agence Eureka), passes away at age 68.

May 
 May 1: Tom Artis, American comics artist (DC Comics, Marvel Comics, Fleetway), dies at age 51.
 May 6: Oscar Blotta, Argentine comics artist (El Gnomo Pimenton, Ventajita), dies at age 88 or 89.
 May 8: Manuel Moro, Mexican comics artist (Aníbal 5), dies at age 77.

June
 June 5: Arnaud Leterrier, French comics artist (Finn Mac Cumhall, Les Chasseurs de Rêves), dies at age 39.
 June 7: Roger Armstrong, American comics artist (Disney comics, the Bugs Bunny newspaper comic strip, continued Napoleon and Uncle Elby and Little Lulu), passes away at age 89.
 June 10: Taizo Yokoyama, Japanese cartoonist and comics artist (Pu-San, Shakai Gihyo), dies at age 90.
 June 18: Pratap Mullick, Indian comic artist (Nagraj), dies at age 70. 
 June 20: John Bernard Handelsman, British comics artist, cartoonist and illustrator (Freaky Fables), passes away at age 85.
 June 22: Jeff Wilkinson, Australian comics artist (The Phantom Ranger, The Shadow, Kid Champion), dies at age 82.
 June 24: 
 Giovanni Boselli, Italian comics artist (Susy Rosa, Gec Sparaspara, Joe Felix, Zia Rapunzía, Pachito Olé, Bellocchio e Leccamuffo, Il Signor Beniamino, Dodo & Cocco, Quelli del West, Topo Leonardo), dies at age 83.
 Pil, Belgian cartoonist (Meneerke Peeters), dies at age 82.
 June 28: Howie Schneider, American comics artist (Eek & Meek, Percy's World, Bimbo's Circus, The Sunshine Club), dies at age 77 from complications from heart bypass surgery.

July
 July 10–11: Doug Marlette, American comics artist (Kudzu), dies at age 57 in a car accident.
 July 14: Harry Driggs, American underground cartoonist, dies at age 71.
 July 19: Roberto Fontanarrosa, aka El Negro, Argentine comics artist (Inodoro Pereyra, Boogie, el aceitoso), dies at age 62.

August
 August 12: Mike Wieringo, American comics artist (DC Comics, co-creator of Tellos), dies at age 44.
 August 26: Larry Woromay, American comic artist (worked for EC Comics and Charlton Comics, contributed to Eerie), dies at age 80.
 Specific date unknown: August: Phil Gascoine, British comic book artist (The Sarge), dies at age 72-73.

September 
 September 6: 
 George L. Crenshaw, American comics artist and cartoonist (Belvedere), dies at age 93.
 Ian Gray, British comics writer (wrote gag comics for The Beano), dies at age 69 from a heart attack.
 September 7: Ruben Sosa, Argentinian comic artist (worked on Mister X, Ernie Pike), dies at age 65 or 66. 
 September 13: Phil Frank, American comics artist (Farley), dies at age 64 from a brain tumor.
 September 14: Horst Klöpfel, German comics artist and painter, dies at age 82 or 83.
 September 28: Jan van der Aa, aka Punt, Belgian painter, cartoonist and comics artist (De Perfesser), dies at age 80.

October 
 October 2: Richard Goldwater, American editor-in-chief of Archie Comics, dies of cancer at age 71.
 October 3: 
 Manfred Sommer, Spanish comics artist (Frank Cappa), dies at age 74.
 Elmer Wexler, American illustrator and comics artist (Vic Jordan, Jon Jason), dies at age 89.
 October 5: Josette Macherot, wife of Raymond Macherot and colorist of his comics, dies at age 77.
 October 20: Peg Bracken, American writer and comics writer (Phoebe, Get Your Man, with Homer Groening), dies at age 89.

November 
 November 5: Paul Norris, American comics artist (co-creator of Aquaman, continued Brick Bradford), dies at age 93.
 November 27: Donyo Donev, Bulgarian cartoonist, caricaturist, animator and comics artist (The Three Fools, Trimata Glupaci, Chetirmata Glupaci, Umno Selo), dies at age 81.

December
 December 3: 
 Eduard De Rop, Belgian comics artist (Studio Vandersteen, De Geschiedenis van Sleenovia, assisted and continued Pats, De Rode Ridder and Jerom), passes away at age 79.
 James Kemsley, Australian comics artist (Frogin, continued Ginger Meggs), dies at age 59.
 December 8: Al Scaduto, American comics artist (assisted on and continued They'll Do It Every Time, Little Iodine, dies at age 79.
 December 9: Wayne Howard, American comics artist (Charlton Comics), dies at age 58.
 December 14: Dave Gantz, American cartoonist, novelist and sculptor (Little Lizzie, Moxy, Dudley D., Don Q., assisted on Peanuts, worked for Timely Comics),  dies at age 85.
 December 23: Raphaël Carlo Marcello, also known as Ralph Marc, Italian comics artist (Docteur Justice, continued Le Cavalier Inconnu), dies at age 78.
 December 25: Gualtiero Schiaffino, aka Skiaffino, Italian comics artist (I Santicielo, La Bancarella, I Diavoli), dies at age 54.
 December 27: Wim Meuldijk, Dutch TV writer and comics artist (Ketelbinkie, Sneeuwvlok de Eskimo), passes away at age 85.

Specific date unknown
 Herbert Geldhof, aka Herbert, Belgian comics artist (Docteur Gladstone, worked on L'oncle Paul), dies at age 77 or 78.
 Hui Guan-man, Chinese comics artist (Uncle Choi), dies at age 70.

Exhibitions and shows
 March 4 – June 11: Museum of Modern Art (New York City) — "Comic Abstraction: Image-Breaking, Image-Making," an exhibition of fine artists who use the language of comics as the jumping-off point for their work
 April 5 – July 1: The Cartoon Museum (London, England) — "Alice in Sunderland: The Exhibition," featuring work from Bryan Talbot's graphic novel, as well as its various influences
 April 21–August 19: Phoenix Art Museum (Phoenix, Arizona) — "UnInked: Paintings, Sculpture and Graphic Work by Five Cartoonists," featuring Kim Deitch, Jerry Moriarty, Gary Panter, Ron Regé Jr. and Seth; guest-curated by Chris Ware
 May–June: Jackson State University (Jackson, Mississippi) — "Other Heroes: African-American Comics, Creators, Characters, and Archetypes," curated by John Jennings and Damien Duffy
 September 14, 2007–January 24, 2008: Museum of Comic and Cartoon Art (New York City) — "Infinite Canvas: The Art of Webcomics", featuring the work of Dean Haspiel, Dan Goldman, Josh Neufeld, Jerry Holkins & Mike Krahulik, John Allison, Batton Lash and others
 December 6–January 1, 2008: Floating World Comics (Portland, Oregon) — "Spacenight: A Tribute to Bill Mantlo", a fundraiser exhibition of Rom the Spaceknight illustrations, by such creators as Jeffrey Brown, Sal Buscema, Guy Davis, Renée French, Brandon Graham, Corey Lewis, Walt Simonson, Al Milgrom, Jeff Parker, Ron Regé Jr., and Danijel Žeželj.

Conventions
 January 19–20: Big Apple Comic Book Art, and Toy Show I (Penn Plaza Pavilion, New York City, USA) — guests include Seth Tobocman, James Romberger, Alex Maleev, Alex Saviuk, Arnold Drake, Mac McGill, Bill Sienkiewicz, Dan Slott, Danny Fingeroth, Dennis Calero, Dick Ayers, Fred Harper, Guy Dorian, Guy Gilchrist, Ian Dorian, Irwin Hasen, Ivan Brandon, Ivan Velez, Jamal Igle, Jim Kyle, Jennifer Camper, Jim Salicrup, Jim Sherman, Ken Gale, Mark Texeira, Mercy Van Vlack, Michael Avon Oeming, Rich Buckler, Sean Chen, and Tommy Castillo
 January 27–28: Phoenix Comicon (Mesa, Arizona) — 3,200 attendees; official guests: Shannon Denton, Crispin Freeman, Tiffany Grant, Matt Greenfield, M. Alice LeGrow, Angel Medina, Vic Mignogna, George Pérez, Jen Quick, and Amy Reeder Hadley
 February 16–18: MegaCon (Orange County Convention Center, Orlando, Florida, USA) — guests include David Finch, Darwyn Cooke, George Pérez, Andy Smith, Brian Pulido, Sean Astin, Lou Ferrigno, Virginia Hey, Bob May, David Hedison, and "Lois Lane" actresses Noel Neill and Margot Kidder (guests June Lockhart and Mark Goddard canceled)
 February 23–25: New York Comic-Con (Jacob K. Javits Convention Center, New York City, USA) — guest of honor: George Pérez; official guest: Peter David
 March 2–4: WonderCon (Moscone Center West, San Francisco, California, USA)
 March 3: STAPLE! (Red Oak Ballroom, Austin, Texas, USA) — guests: Dean Haspiel, Brian Keene, Danielle Corsetto, Jim Mahfood, Dave Crosland, and David Hopkins
 March 16–18: Wizard World Los Angeles (Long Beach Convention Center, Long Beach, California, USA)
 March 17: UK Web & Mini Comix Thing (London, UK)
 March 24–25: Steel City Con (Pittsburgh Expomart, Monroeville, Pennsylvania) — guests include Matthew Atherton/Feedback
 March 31–April 1: Emerald City ComiCon (Qwest Field Event Center, Seattle, Washington, USA) — 7,000 attendees; guests: Mark Bagley, David Mack, Terry Moore, Mike Oeming, Michael Golden, Gene Ha, Phil Hester, Ron Marz, Jim Lawson, Ande Parks, Joseph Michael Linsner, Chris Sprouse, Mark Waid, Peter Gross, Frank Cho, Brian Pulido, Brian Wood, Dexter Vines, Georges Jeanty, Eric Shanower, Adam Hughes, Brian Michael Bendis, Jim Woodring, Scott Kurtz, Jim Valentino, Peter Bagge, Darick Robertson, Steve Lieber, David Hahn, Matthew Clark, Jeff Parker, Ed Brubaker, Brian Reed, Kurt Busiek, Paul Chadwick, Tim Sale, Clayton Crain, Mike Grell, Andy Kuhn, Aaron Lopresti, Alex Maleev, Gail Simone, and Greg Rucka
 April 7: FLUKE Mini-Comics & Zine Festival (Tasty World, Athens, Georgia)
 April 12–15: Coco Bulles (Culture Palace of Abidjan, Côte d'Ivoire)
 April 13–15: Toronto ComiCON Fan Appreciation Event (Metro Toronto Convention Centre, Toronto, Ontario, Canada)
 April 21–22: Alternative Press Expo (Concourse Exhibition Center, San Francisco, California, USA)
 April 21–22: Small Press and Alternative Comics Expo (S.P.A.C.E.) (Aladdin Shrine Center, Columbus, Ohio) — event expands to two days; special guest: Dave Sim
 April 27–29: Pittsburgh Comicon (Radisson Hotel Pittsburgh ExpoMart, Monroeville, Pennsylvania) — guests include George Pérez, Ron Frenz, Terry Moore, Amanda Conner, Mike Grell, Adam Hughes, Joe Jusko, Joseph Michael Linsner, and David W. Mack 
 May 12–13: Comic Expo (British Empire & Commonwealth Exhibition Hall/Ramada Plaza Hotel, Bristol, UK) — guests include Kurt Busiek, Brian K Vaughan, Jeph Loeb, and Jean-Pierre Dionnet. Presentation of the Eagle Awards, hosted by Norman Lovett.
 May 17–18: East Coast Black Age of Comics Convention (African American Museum in Philadelphia and Anderson Hall (Temple University), Philadelphia, Pennsylvania) — guests include Dwayne McDuffie, Kyle Baker, and Taimak; presentation of the Glyph Comics Awards
 May 18–20: Motor City Comic Con (Rock Findancial Showplace, Novi, Michigan) — guests include BarBara Luna, Louis Gossett Jr., and Lou Ferrigno
 June 1–3: Adventure Con (Knoxville Convention Center, Knoxville, Tennessee, USA) — first event held under the new ownership by Las Vegas Autographs, LLC. Guest of honor: Ethan Van Sciver; other guests include John Romita Jr.
 June 8–-10: Toronto Comic Con (Direct Energy Centre, Hall C, Toronto, Ontario, Canada) — guests of honor: Michael Golden, Terry Moore, Marv Wolfman, and Matt Wagner
 June 15–17: Heroes Convention (Charlotte Convention Center, Charlotte, North Carolina, USA) — guests include Jim Amash, Robert Atkins, Kyle Baker, John Beatty, Christian Beranek, Mark Brooks, Nick Cardy, Richard Case, Johanna Draper Carlson, K. C. Carlson, C. B. Cebulski, Bernard Chang, Sean Chen, Cliff Chiang, Paul Conrad, Peter David, Rosario Dawson, Kelly Sue DeConnick, Tania del Rio, Todd Dezago, Dan Didio, Tony DiGerolamo, Colleen Doran, Dave Dorman, Tommy Lee Edwards, Michael Eury, Tom Feister, Ian Flynn, Matt Fraction, Francesco Francavilla, Robin Furth, Craig Gilmore, Dick Giordano, Michael Golden, Keron Grant, Cully Hamner, Scott Hampton, Tony Harris, Irwin Hasen, Jeremy Haun, Paul Hornschemeier, Adam Hughes, Jamal Igle, Mark Irwin, Georges Jeanty, Nat Jones, Rafael Kayanan, Barry Kitson, Erik Larsen, John Paul Leon, John Lucas, Heidi MacDonald, Jim Mahfood, Laura Martin, Nathan Massengill, Paul Maybury, Ed McGuinness, Bob McLeod, Joshua Middleton, Tony Moore, Steve Niles, Phil Noto, Jeff Parker, Jason Pearson, Brandon Peterson,  Chris Pitzer, Eric Powell, Rick Remender, Andrew Robinson, Don Rosa, Craig Rousseau, Andy Runton, Chris Samnee, Alex Saviuk, Bill Sienkiewicz, Joe Simon, Chris Staros, Joe Staton, Karl Story, Ryan Stegman, Brian Stelfreeze, Arthur Suydam, Mark Texeira, Roy Thomas, Tim Townsend, Dean Trippe, Koi Turnbull, Chris Walker, Loston Wallace, Daniel Way, Mike Wieringo, Renée Witterstaetter, Ethan Van Sciver, Dexter Vines, Tracy Yardley, and Skottie Young
 June 15–17: Wizard World Philadelphia (Philadelphia Convention Center, Philadelphia, Pennsylvania, USA)
 June 23–24: Big Apple Comic Book Art, and Toy Show "Summer Sizzler" (Penn Plaza Pavilion, New York City, USA) — guests include Alan Kupperberg, Alex Niño, Alex Maleev, Cameron Stewart, Dan Fogel, Danny Fingeroth, Ernie Chan, Graig Weich, Guy Dorian, Ian Dorian, J. David Spurlock, Jay Lynch, Ken Kelly, Michael Golden, Michael Avon Oeming, Mitchell Breitweiser, Murphy Anderson, Neil Vokes, Paul Gulacy, Rags Morales, Rich Buckler, Rudy Nebres, Skip Williamson, Tommy Castillo, and Walt Simonson
 June 23–24: MoCCA Festival (Puck Building, New York City, USA)
 June 30–July 1: Dallas Comic Con ("DCC9") (Richardson Civic Center, Richardson, Texas) — guest of honor: Herb Trimpe; official guests: Billy Tan, Bill Willingham, Matthew Sturges, Kristian Donaldson, Brian Denham, Josh Howard, The Crow creator James O'Barr, Ben Dunn, Jamie Mendoza, Steve Irwin, Kez Wilson, Kenneth Smith, Cal Slayton, Baldo writer Hector Cantú, multiple Hugo-winning fan artist Brad W. Foster, and more
 July 26–29: Comic-Con International (San Diego Convention Center, San Diego, California, USA) — 125,000 attendees; official guests: Sergio Aragonés, Alison Bechdel, Allen Bellman, Ray Bradbury, Dan Brereton, Daryl Cagle, Cecil Castellucci, Darwyn Cooke, Guy Delisle, Paul Dini, Roman Dirge, Cory Doctorow, Ann Eisner, Warren Ellis, Mark Evanier, Renee French, Gary Friedrich, Christos N. Gage, Neil Gaiman, Rick Geary, George Gladir, Laurell K. Hamilton, Gilbert Hernandez, Jaime Hernandez, Adam Hughes, Joe Jusko, Miriam Katin, Mel Keefer, Scott Kurtz, Joseph Michael Linsner, Joe Matt, David Morrell, Karen Palinko, Lily Renee Phillips, Mike Ploog, Paul Pope, George A. Romero, Rowena, Dave Stevens, J. Michael Straczynski, Ben Templesmith, Roy Thomas, Morrie Turner, Mark Verheiden, Matt Wagner, J. H. Williams III, Kent Williams, F. Paul Wilson, Brian Wood, and more.
 August 9–12: Wizard World Chicago (Donald E. Stephens Convention Center, Rosemont, Illinois, USA)
 August 11–12: CAPTION: "Dreams and Nightmares" (East Oxford Community Centre, Oxford, England, UK)
 August 18–19: Toronto Comic Arts Festival (Old Victoria College, Toronto, Ontario, Canada)
 August 24–26: Fan Expo Canada (Metro Toronto Convention Centre, Toronto, Ontario, Canada) — 43,738 attendees; guests include Adam West, Jonathan Frakes, Tricia Helfer, David Prowse, Malcolm McDowell, Robert Beltran, Dario Argento, Adrienne Barbeau, John Romita Jr. and John Romita Sr., Greg Pak, Olivier Coipel, Simone Bianchi, Paul Dini, Steve McNiven, David Finch (comics), Michael Turner, Frank Quitely, and Dale Eaglesham
 August 31–September 3: Dragon Con (Hyatt Regency Atlanta/Marriott Marquis/Atlanta Hilton, Atlanta, Georgia, USA) — 30,000+ attendees; guests include Lewis Gossett Jr., Tara McPherson, Erik Estrada, and the MythBusters build team
 September 1–2: London Film & Comic Con (London, UK)
 September 11–15: Jornadas de Cómic (Aviles, Spain)
 September 14–16: Comics Salon (Bratislava, Slovakia)
 September 15–16: Montreal Comiccon (Place Bonaventure, Montreal, Quebec, Canada) — 700 attendees
 September 29–30: Stumptown Comics Fest (Lloyd Center Doubletree, Portland, Oregon)
 October 12–13: Komikazen (Ravenna, Italy) — guest of honor is Ho Che Anderson
 October 12–13: Small Press Expo (Marriott Bethesda North Hotel & Conference Center, Bethesda, Maryland, USA)
 October 27–28: Manitoba Comic Con (Victoria Inn, Winnipeg, Manitoba, Canada) — guests include David Prowse, Richard Hatch, Margot Kidder
 November 16–18: Big Apple Comic Book Art, and Toy Show III (Penn Plaza Pavilion, New York City, USA) — guests include Adam Hughes, Alan Kupperberg, Alan Weiss, Alex Maleev, Alex Saviuk, Amanda Conner, Bernard Chang, William Tucci, Bob Hall, Bob Layton, Bob McLeod, Carmine Infantino, Chris Moreno, Darwyn Cooke, Dan Slott, Danny Fingeroth, Dennis Calero, Dick Ayers, Elayne Riggs, Frank Cho, Gary Friedrich, Graig Weich, Guy Dorian, Herb Trimpe, Ian Dorian, Irwin Hasen, Ivan Brandon, Joe Sinnott, Jim Steranko, John Romita Sr, Jim Calafiore, Jimmy Palmiotti, Jim Salicrup, Ken Gale, Ken Kelly, Kim Deitch, Kyle Baker, Mark Bodé, Mark Evanier, Mark Texeira, Mercy Van Vlack, Michael Gaydos, Michael Golden, Michael Netzer, Neal Adams, Norm Breyfogle, Paolo Rivera, William Foster III, Rich Buckler, Robin Riggs, Ron Garney, S. Clay Wilson, Sean Chen, Sergio Aragonés, Spain Rodriguez, Tim Sale, Tim Vigil, and Tom Feister
 November 16–18: Wizard World Texas (Arlington Convention Center, Dallas, Texas, USA) — guests include Dan Didio, Marc Silvestri, Adam Kubert, Bill Sienkiewicz, Arthur Sudyam, and Laura Vandervoort
 November 18–19: Dublin City Comic Con (Tara Towers Hotel, Dublin, Ireland) — 2nd annual show; guests include: Jim Lee (Guest of Honour), Mark Millar, Steve McNiven, Doug Braithwaite, Ben Oliver, Jock, Carlos Pacheco, Adi Granov, Andy Diggle, Liam Sharp, C. B. Cebulski, Paul Cornell, Nick Roche, Stephen Mooney, Steve Thompson, John McCrea, Simon Bisley
 November 24–25: Mid-Ohio Con (Columbus Convention Center, Columbus, Ohio, USA)

First issues by title

Alice in Sunderland (graphic novel)
Release: April 5. Writer: Bryan Talbot. Artist: Bryan Talbot.

Arkin Comics
Release: by Arkin Ventures Pvt. Ltd. Editor: Shamik Dasgupta.

Banimon
Release: by Rocket North Press. Writer and Artist: Boris Savic.

BeanoMAX
Release: First issue was dated the first of March 2007, this comic was a monthly spinoff of the British comic The Beano.

Kartun Benny & Mice: Jakarta Luar Dalem
Release 2005. Writer: Benny Rachmadi Artist: Muhammad "Mice" Misrad

Forge of War (6-issue mini-series)
Release: May by Boom! Studios. Writers: Dan Abnett and Ian Edginton. Artist: Rahsan Ekedal.

Freddy vs. Jason vs. Ash (6-issue mini-series)
Release: November by Wildstorm, Dynamite Entertainment. Writer: James Kuhoric Artist: Jason Craig

Kamisama Dolls
Release: January by Shogakukan  (Monthly Sunday Gene-X). Author: Hajime Yamamura

Last Blood
Release: May by Blatant Comics. Writer: Bobby Crosby Artist: Owen Gieni

March Comes in Like a Lion
Release: by Hakusensha  (Young Animal). Author: Chica Umino

Northlanders
Release: December 5 by Vertigo. Writers: Brian Wood. Art by: Davide Gianfelice

Omega the Unknown
Release: Early 2006 by Marvel Comics. Writer: Jonathan Lethem. Art by: Farel Dalrymple and colorist Paul Hornschemeier.

Superman & Batman vs. Aliens & Predator (2-issue mini-series)
Release: January 10 by DC Comics. Writer: Mark Schultz .Art by: Ariel Olivetti.

Ward of the State
Release: May by Shadowline. Writer: Christopher Long Artist: Chee

Renamed titles
Dandy Xtreme
Release: The Dandy became the Dandy Xtreme in issue 3426 dated the 2 August 2007.

References